Brenchley is a surname. Notable people with the surname include:

 Chaz Brenchley (born 1959), British writer
 Edgar Brenchley (1912–1975), British-Canadian ice hockey player
 Frank Brenchley (1918–2011), British diplomat
 Henry Brenchley (1828–1887), English cricketer
 Julius Brenchley (1816–1873), English explorer, naturalist and author
 Patrick J. Brenchley, British geologist
 Peter Brenchley (1936–1991), Australian rules footballer
 Thomas Brenchley (1822–1894), English cricketer
 Winifred Elsie Brenchley (1883–1953)  OBE, FLS, FRES, an agricultural botanist in the U.K.

See also
 Viscounts Monckton of Brenchley
 Walter Monckton, 1st Viscount Monckton of Brenchley
 Gilbert Walter Riversdale Monckton, 2nd Viscount Monckton of Brenchley
 Christopher Monckton, 3rd Viscount Monckton of Brenchley
 Benchley
 Brenchley Furnace, on River Ties, first mentioned in 1574; still operating in 1667.